Épaney is a commune in the Calvados department in the Normandy region in northwestern France. Jehan Le Saulx d'Espanney, the 16th-century French playwright, was born in the village.

Population

See also
Communes of the Calvados department

References

Communes of Calvados (department)
Calvados communes articles needing translation from French Wikipedia